Jaklić Stadium is a football stadium located in Bugojno, in central Bosnia and Herzegovina. It is the home ground of NK Iskra Bugojno. The total capacity of the stadium is 12,000 seats.

References

External links
Jaklić Stadium at Betstudy

NK Iskra Bugojno
Architecture in Bosnia and Herzegovina
l
Football venues in Yugoslavia